Afriqiyah Airways Flight 771 was a scheduled international Afriqiyah Airways passenger flight that crashed on 12 May 2010 at about 06:01 local time (04:01 UTC) on approach to Tripoli International Airport, about  short of the runway. Of the 104 passengers and crew on board, 103 were killed. The sole survivor was a 9-year-old Dutch boy. The crash of Flight 771 was the third hull-loss of an Airbus A330 involving fatalities, occurring eleven months after the crash of Air France Flight 447.

Aircraft and crew
The aircraft was an Airbus A330-202, registration 5A-ONG, manufacturer's serial number (MSN) 1024, fitted with two General Electric CF6-80E1A4 engines. It first flew on 12 August 2009 and was delivered to Afriqiyah Airways on 8 September 2009. At the time of the accident, it had approximately 1,600 hours total flying time and about 420 take-off and landing cycles. It was configured for a capacity of 230 passengers and 13 crew, including 30 business class seats and 200 economy class seats. This particular flight carried 93 passengers and 11 crew. Most of the passengers were Dutch citizens returning from holiday in South Africa. An airport official stated that 13 Libyans, both passengers and crew, as well 70 Dutch nationals had died in the crash.

The flight crew consisted of the following:

 The Captain was 57-year-old Yousef Bashir Al-Saadi (PNF-Pilot Not Flying). He was hired by Afriqiyah Airways in 2007 and had 17,016 flight hours.
 The first officer was 42-year-old Tareq Mousa Abu Al-Chaouachi (PF-Pilot Flying). He had 4,216 flight hours.
 The relief first officer was 37-year-old Nazem Al-Mabruk Al-Tarhuni (PNF-Pilot Not Flying). He had 1,866 flight hours.
All three crew members had logged 516 hours on the Airbus A330.

Flight and accident
The flight originated at OR Tambo International Airport, serving Johannesburg, South Africa. Its destination was Tripoli International Airport, Libya.

At 5:29, the captain contacted Tripoli ATC. The controller cleared the flight direct to Tripoli for a "TW" locator approach to runway 09. It also reported weather data to Flight 771, and cleared the flight to descend as well. The controller also directed flight for a landing in an easterly approach on runway 09.

At 5:58, the crew contacted the tower controller. The controller noted them to continue the approach and to report the runway in sight.

On route to the locator beacon "TW", the flight crew discussed about by which procedure they will approach the runway, by the time the landing procedure should have already been chosen. When the landing procedure was selected, the first officer immediately activated the procedure, and the aircraft began its final descent for landing too early, before the "TW" locator, where the final approach should have commenced. Other pilots did not notice the mistake. The flight crew did not acquire any visual ground references before initiating their approach to land.

At 6:00, Flight 771 passed "TW" locator at 1000 feet, 200 feet below the prescribed altitude. As the flight approached the decision altitude of 720 feet, the captain commanded to continue the descent, despite having no runway in sight.

The captain ordered a go-around and the autopilot was turned off.

The first officer put the nose of the aircraft up for 4 seconds and the thrust levers were set to go-around power. The aircraft pitched up to 12.3° nose up and the flight crew raised the landing gear and flaps. Shortly thereafter the co-pilot started making nose down inputs which caused the aircraft to pitch-attitude to reduce to 3.5° nose down. (The co-pilot could have been focused on the aircraft's speed, rather than its altitude.) The go-around pitch attitude was not maintained and the instructions from the flight director were not followed. (The report says that fatigue could have played a role in causing the first officer to focus solely on the airspeed.) The captain and the first officer were making inputs to the aircraft's side stick at the same time (although the dual inputs were not sufficient enough to trigger a "dual-input" warning). This action appears to be intended to provide assistance by the captain to fly the aircraft. This action led to confusion on who was flying the aircraft. The ground proximity warning system sounded "too low terrain," "sink rate," and "pull up" alarms as the aircraft lost more height and the co-pilot responded with a sharp nose-down input. Then the captain took control of the aircraft without warning, via the side stick priority button and maintained the nose-down input, while the first officer was simultaneously pulling back on his own side stick. The captain was also pulling his side stick fully back, suggesting both pilots were aware of the aircraft's impending collision with the ground. The aircraft was destroyed by the impact and post-crash fire.

During the final approach and up to the moment of the accident the pilot had not reported any problems to the control tower. Libyan Transport Minister Mohammed Ali Zidan ruled out terrorism as a cause. During the accident, the aircraft damaged a house on the ground. The homeowner, his wife, and their five children escaped unharmed. The house and a nearby mosque are scheduled to be demolished as part of the airport expansion plans. The first body of a non-Libyan passenger was repatriated to the Netherlands on 27 May 2010. On 21 June 2010 the Libyan authorities began clearing the accident site of Afriqiyah 771.

The accident is the second deadliest involving an Airbus A330 (after Air France Flight 447), and the second deadliest accident to have occurred in Libya. It also was the first fatal accident for Afriqiyah Airways.

Investigation
The Libyan Civil Aviation Authority (LYCAA) opened an investigation into the accident. Airbus stated that it would provide full technical assistance to the authorities investigating the crash, and would do so via the French Bureau of Enquiry and Analysis for Civil Aviation Safety (BEA). The South African Civil Aviation Authority sent a team to assist with the investigation. The BEA assisted in the investigation with an initial team of two investigators, accompanied by five advisors from Airbus. The Dutch Safety Board (literally "Investigation Council for Safety") sent an observer. The flight recorders were recovered and sent to Paris for analysis soon after the incident.

Authorities reviewed the recordings made by the Flight Data Recorder. In August 2010, it was reported that preliminary investigations were complete. There was no evidence of any technical problems nor was there any fuel shortage. No technical or medical problems had been reported by the crew and they had not requested any assistance.

On 28 February 2013, the Libyan Civil Aviation Authority announced that they had determined that the cause of the crash was pilot error. Crew resource management lacked/was insufficient, sensory illusions, and the first officer's inputs to the aircraft side stick were a contributing factor in the crash. Fatigue was also named as a possible contributing factor in the accident.

The final report stated that the accident resulted from the pilots' lack of a common action plan during the approach, the final approach being continued below the Minimum Decision Altitude without ground visual reference being acquired, the inappropriate application of flight control inputs during the go-around and after the activation of the Terrain Awareness and Warning System, and the flight crew's lack of monitoring and controlling of the flight path.

Reactions
Afriqiyah Airways issued a statement saying that relatives of the victims who wished to visit Libya would be transported and accommodated at Afriqiyah's expense. The Libyan authorities relaxed certain passport restrictions and guaranteed the granting of visas. By 15 May 2010 the airline opened the Family Assistance Centre in a hotel in Tripoli to care for family members and relatives of crash victims who were visiting Libya. The executive team of Afriqiyah, including the CEO and the chairperson of the board, met family members at the hotel. Some family members wanted to visit the crash site; they traveled to the site and placed flowers there. The airline permanently retired the flight number 771 and it has been re-designated to 788 for Tripoli to Johannesburg and 789 for the return flight.

Queen Beatrix of the Netherlands expressed her shock at hearing the news. The President of South Africa, Jacob Zuma, also offered his condolences.

The 2020 novel Dear Edward by Ann Napolitano, which tells the story of a 12-year-old boy who is the sole survivor of a plane crash that kills all of the other 191 passengers, was inspired in part by the Afriqiyah Airways Flight 771 crash.

Passengers

The passengers aboard Flight 771 were of various nationalities. All of the eleven crew members were Libyans. One passenger held dual citizenship. The following list reflects the airline's passenger nationality count of the victims. The airline released the manifest on the morning of 15 May 2010; the airline sent the list to several related embassies.

* one South African passport holder, Bree O'Mara, had dual South African and Irish citizenships.

The sole survivor was a 9-year-old Dutch boy from Tilburg, who was returning from a safari with his parents and brother (all of whom died in the accident). Dutch Foreign Ministry spokesman Ad Meijer said the child had no life-threatening injuries. Saif al-Islam Gaddafi and Captain Sabri Shadi, the head of Afriqiyah Airways, visited the boy while he was hospitalised in Libya. On 15 May, he was transferred by air ambulance to Eindhoven in the Netherlands. The boy was accompanied on the flight by his paternal aunt and uncle, who later gained custody of him.

Of the passengers, 42 were to continue to Düsseldorf, 32 to Brussels, seven to London, and one to Paris. Eleven of the passengers had Libya as their final destination. Of the 71 passengers identified as Dutch by the Dutch Ministry of Foreign Affairs, 38 were travelling with the Stip travel agency, 24 were travelling with the Kras travel agency, and 9, including the survivor, had their tickets booked independently. One of the Dutch victims was Joëlle van Noppen, singer in the former Dutch girl group WOW!.

On the evening of 12 May 2010, the Irish Department of Foreign Affairs confirmed that one of its passport holders was on the plane, novelist Bree O'Mara.

See also

Air France Flight 447 – the deadliest accident involving an Airbus A330, which occurred just less than a year before this crash took place. All 228 people on board were killed.
AIRES Flight 8250 – a case where the crew experienced illusions during a black hole approach.
Airbus Industrie Flight 129 – the first fatal accident involving an A330, 7 crew members died while the aircraft stalled and crashed near Toulouse.
Gulf Air Flight 072 – the crew experienced somatogravic illusion during a go-around.
Libyan Arab Airlines Flight 1103 – the deadliest aviation accident in Libya at the time Flight 771 crashed.
List of sole survivors of airline accidents or incidents

Notes

A ^ Translation: METAR for Tripoli International Airport, issued at 03:50 UTC on the 12th of the month. Winds variable in direction at 1 knot (1.9 km/h), visibility 6,000 metres (3.7 miles), no significant cloud cover, temperature 19 °C, dewpoint 17 °C, altimeter setting 1008 hPa

References

Further reading 
 Ash, Nigel. "Pilot error caused 2010 Afriqiyah crash." Libya Herald. 28 February 2013.
 Kaminski-Morrow, David. "Illusion and ambiguous control led to Afriqiyah A330 crash." Flight International. 28 February 2013.

External links

 Libyan Civil Aviation Authority
 Final report
Part 1  (Alternate) (Archive)
 Part 2 (Archive)
 Part 3 (Archive)
 Part 4 (Archive)
 Letter from Libyan CAA to Dutch Safety Board (Archive)
 Dutch Safety Board
 "AIRPLANE CRASH LIBYA, MAY 12, 2010, TRIPOLI" (Archive)
 "VLIEGTUIGONGEVAL LIBIE, 12 MEI 2010, TRIPOLI."  – Several releases are only in Dutch (Archive)
Flight Afriqiyah Airways 771 Johannesburg – Tripoli  – Afriqiyah Airways (Archive)
Arabic content  (Archive)
"Airplane crash in Tripoli." Ministry of Foreign Affairs of the Netherlands (Archive)
"Afriqiyah Airways A330 Crash." South African Civil Aviation Authority (Archive)
"Flight 8U 771 on 12 May 2010 – A 330 – 200, registered 5A-ONG." Bureau of Enquiry and Analysis for Civil Aviation Safety (Archive)

2010 in Libya
Accidents and incidents involving the Airbus A330
Aviation accidents and incidents in 2010
Aviation accidents and incidents in Libya
771
Airliner accidents and incidents involving controlled flight into terrain
May 2010 events in Africa
Airliner accidents and incidents caused by pilot error